Carlos Cavazo (born July 8, 1957) is an American guitarist best known as the guitarist for Quiet Riot during their commercial peak.  He has also played with Snow, 3 Legged Dogg, Hollywood Allstarz, and Ratt.

Biography
Cavazo was born in Atlanta, Georgia, in 1957 to a Mexican father and an American mother. Forming Speed Of Light with his older brother Tony in 1973 in Anaheim (Hills), Orange County, CA, Carlos would have been part of the 1st graduating at Canyon High School, however,  he left school his senior year to pursue music. The band would evolve into Snow by 1978 with the addition of vocalist Doug Ellison and drummer Stephen Quadros. Snow built up a loyal following on the L.A. club circuit over the next couple of years and in 1980 released a self-financed eponymous 5-song EP, re-issued as part of the At Last archives release in 2017. Snow played a reunion show at the Whisky a Go Go on November 8, 2017 (with Amargo, Stonebreed, Angeles and, Pancho Villa’s Skull) to celebrate the release of At Last.

Replacing Randy Rhoads in the reformed Quiet Riot in 1982 he remained with the band into the 2000s until the band split up.  However, when vocalist Kevin DuBrow reformed the band to record the 2006 album Rehab, Cavazo was not included.

Cavazo was a founding member of 3 Legged Dogg, a supergroup made up of drummer Vinny Appice (Black Sabbath, Dio, Heaven & Hell), bassist Jimmy Bain (Rainbow, Dio), vocalist Chas West (Bonham, Foreigner) and guitarist Brian Young (David Lee Roth). They released one album, Frozen Summer in 2006. The band was sued in 2019 by Rick Derringer, who alleged he wrote all the band's songs.

Until spring of 2018, he was a member of Ratt, replacing John Corabi in 2008.

Discography

Snow
1980 Snow

Max Havoc, LTD
1983 Max Havoc

Quiet Riot
1983 Metal Health
1984 Condition Critical
1986 QR III
1988 QR
1993 Terrified
1995 Down to the Bone
1999 Alive and Well
2001 Guilty Pleasures

Hear 'n Aid
1985 Hear 'n Aid

3 Legged Dogg
2006 Frozen Summer

Power Project
2006 Dinosaurs

Tim "Ripper" Owens
2009 Play My Game

Ratt
2010 Infestation

References

1957 births
Living people
American rock guitarists
American male guitarists
American heavy metal guitarists
American musicians of Mexican descent
Glam metal musicians
People from Anaheim, California
Guitarists from California
Quiet Riot members
Ratt members
20th-century American guitarists
21st-century American guitarists
Hispanic and Latino American musicians